The Israel national judo team consists of the men's team coached by Olympic medalist Oren Smadja and the women's team coached by Shany Hershko.

The team won a bronze medal at the mixed team event of the 2020 Summer Olympics. Previously, the men's team won a gold medal at the 2005 European Team Championships.

Seniors

Individual

Active judoka
The following are medals won in individual Olympic competitions, World and European Championships as well as World Tour tournaments, by active members of the Israel national judo team, as of 18 February 2023, after the 2023 Judo Grand Slam Tel Aviv.

Current national team coaches 
As of 13 October 2022

Men's head coach: Oren Smadja

Other men's coaches: Guy Fogel, Gil Ofer, Golan Pollack & Artur Katayev.

Women's head coach: Shany Hershko

Other women's coaches: Charles Chibana, Miki Tanaka & Amélie Rosseneu.

Olympic, World and European championships

Team

2005 European Team Championships

{| class="wikitable" style="border: none; background: none;"
! Stage !! Opponent !! Result
| rowspan=3 style="width:1; border: none; background: none;"|
! Men –60 !! Men –66 !! Men –73 !! Men –81 !! Men –90 !! Men –100 !! Men +100
|-
! Semi-finals
| 
| 
|  ||  ||  ||  ||  ||  || 
|-
! Final
| 
| 
|  ||  ||  ||  ||  ||  || 
|-
! colspan=3| References
| style="width:1; border: none; background: none;"|
! 
! 
! 
! 
! 
! 
! 
|}

2006 World Team Championships

{| class="wikitable" style="border: none; background: none;"
! Stage !! Opponent !! Result
| rowspan=4 style="width:1; border: none; background: none;"|
! Men –60 !! Men –66 !! Men –73 !! Men –81 !! Men –90 !! Men –100 !! Men +100
|-
! Round of 16
| 
| 
|  ||  ||  ||  ||  ||  || 
|-
! Quarter-finals
| 
| 
|  ||  ||  ||  ||  ||  || 
|-
! Repechage
| 
| 
| || || || || || ||
|-
! colspan=3| References
| style="width:1; border: none; background: none;"|
! 
! 
! 
! 
! 
! 
! 
|}

2014 European Championships

{| class="wikitable" style="border: none; background: none;"
! Stage !! Opponent !! Result
| rowspan=2 style="width:1; border: none; background: none;"|
! Men –66 !! Men –73 !! Men –81 !! Men –90 !! Men +90
| rowspan=2 style="width:1; border: none; background: none;"|
! 
|-
! Round of 16
| 
| 
|  ||  ||  ||  || 
| 
|}

2018 European Mixed Team Championships

{| class="wikitable" style="border: none; background: none;"
! Stage !! Opponent !! Result
| rowspan=2 style="width:1; border: none; background: none;"|
! Women –57 !! Women –70 !! Women +70 !! Men –73 !! Men –90 !! Men +90
| rowspan=2 style="width:1; border: none; background: none;"|
! 
|-
! Round of 16
| 
| 
|  ||  ||  ||  ||  || 
| 
|}

2020 Summer Olympics

During the 2020 Summer Olympics, the men's squad was coached by Israeli former judoka and Olympic bronze medalist Oren Smadja, whereas the women's team was coached by Israeli former judoka Shany Hershko.

There were 13 Israeli judokas at the 2020 Summer Olympics, but only 12 were registered for the Mixed Team Competition, leaving female judoka Gili Cohen outside. Also, 3 Israeli judokas (Baruch Shmailov, Inbar Lanir, and Shira Rishony) did not actively compete yet they were registered to this tournament, and as such- received the shared Olympic Mixed Team bronze medal as well with the other who had their battles.
{| class="wikitable" style="border: none; background: none;"
! Stage !! Opponent !! Result
| rowspan=5 style="width:1; border: none; background: none;"|
! Women –57 !! Women –70 !! Women +70 !! Men –73 !! Men –90 !! Men +90 !! Golden score
| rowspan=5 style="width:1; border: none; background: none;"|
! 
|-
! First round
| 
| 
|  ||  ||  ||  ||  ||  || 
| 
|-
! Quarter-finals
| 
| 
|  ||  ||  ||  ||  ||  || 
| 
|-
! Repechage
| 
| 
|  ||  ||  ||  ||  ||  || 
| 
|-
! Bronze medal
| 
| 
|  ||  ||  ||  ||  ||  || 
| 
|}

2021 European Mixed Team Championships

{| class="wikitable" style="border: none; background: none;"
! Stage !! Opponent !! Result
| rowspan=4 style="width:1; border: none; background: none;"|
! Women –57 !! Women –70 !! Women +70 !! Men –73 !! Men –90 !! Men +90
| rowspan=4 style="width:1; border: none; background: none;"|
! 
|-
! Round of 16
| 
| 
|  ||  ||  ||  ||  || 
| 
|-
! Repechage 1
| 
| 
|  ||  ||  ||  ||  || 
| 
|-
! Repechage 2
| 
| 
|  ||  ||  ||  ||  || 
| 
|}

2022 World Championships

{| class="wikitable" style="border: none; background: none;"
! Stage !! Opponent !! Result
| rowspan=5 style="width:1; border: none; background: none;"|
! Women –57 !! Women –70 !! Women +70 !! Men –73 !! Men –90 !! Men +90 !! Golden score
| rowspan=5 style="width:1; border: none; background: none;"|
! 
|-
! Round of 16
| 
| 
|  ||  ||  ||  ||  ||  || 
| 
|-
! Quarter-finals
| 
| 
|  ||  ||  ||  ||  ||  || 
| 
|-
! Semi-finals
| 
| 
|  ||  ||  ||  ||  ||  || 
| 
|-
! Bronze medal
| 
| 
|  ||  ||  ||  ||  ||  || 
| 
|}

Under 23

Juniors

Juniors Team

2017 European Junior Judo Championships — Men's team
{| class="wikitable" style="border: none; background: none;"
! Stage !! Opponent !! Result
| rowspan=2 style="width:1; border: none; background: none;"|
! Men –66 !! Men –73 !! Men –81 !! Men –90 !! Men +90
|-
! Round of 16
|  ||  ||  ||  ||  ||  || 
|-
! colspan=2| References
! 
| style="width:1; border: none; background: none;"|
! 
! 
! 
! 
! 
|}

2021 European Junior Judo Championships — Mixed team

{| class="wikitable" style="border: none; background: none;"
! Stage !! Opponent !! Result
| rowspan=2 style="width:1; border: none; background: none;"|
! Women –57 !! Women –70 !! Women +70 !! Men –73 !! Men –90 !! Men +90
|-
! Round of 16
|  ||  ||  ||  ||  ||  ||  || 
|-
! colspan=2| References
! 
| style="width:1; border: none; background: none;"|
! !! !! !! !! !!
|}

Cadets
Updated to 31 July 2022, after the 2022 European Youth Summer Olympic Festival.

Cadets Team

2015 European Cadet Judo Championships — Men's team
{| class="wikitable" style="border: none; background: none;"
! Stage !! Opponent !! Result
| rowspan=6 style="width:1; border: none; background: none;"|
! Men –60 !! Men –66 !! Men –73 !! Men –81 !! Men +81
|-
! Second round
|  ||  ||  ||  ||  ||  || 
|-
! Quarter-finals
|  ||  ||  ||  ||  ||  || 
|-
! Repechage 1
|  ||  ||  ||  ||  ||  || 
|-
! Repechage 2
|  ||  ||  ||  ||  ||  || 
|-
! Bronze
|  ||  ||  ||  ||  ||  || 
|-
! colspan=2| References
! 
| style="width:1; border: none; background: none;"|
! 
! 
! 
! 
! 
|}

2017 European Cadet Judo Championships — Men's team
{| class="wikitable" style="border: none; background: none;"
! Stage !! Opponent !! Result
| rowspan=2 style="width:1; border: none; background: none;"|
! Men –60 !! Men –66 !! Men –73 !! Men –81 !! Men +81
|-
! First round
|  ||  ||  ||  ||  ||  || 
|-
! colspan=2| References
! 
| style="width:1; border: none; background: none;"|
! 
! 
! 
! 
! 
|}

2022 European Youth Summer Olympic Festival — Mixed team
{| class="wikitable" style="border: none; background: none;"
! Stage !! Opponent !! Result
| rowspan=5 style="width:1; border: none; background: none;"|
! Men –66 !! Men –81 !! Men +81 !! Women –52 !! Women –63 !! Women +63
| rowspan=5 style="width:1; border: none; background: none;"|
! Golden score
| rowspan=5 style="width:1; border: none; background: none;"|
! 
|-
! Second round
|  ||  ||  ||  ||  ||  ||  ||  || 
| 
|-
! Quarter-finals
|  ||  ||  ||  ||  ||  ||  ||  || 
| 
|-
! Repechage
|  ||  ||  ||  ||  ||  ||  ||  || 
| 
|-
! Bronze medal
|  ||  ||  ||  ||  ||  ||  ||  || 
| 
|}

References

External links

Judo
Judo in Israel
Israel
Olympic bronze medalists for Israel